Lori Yates is a Canadian country music singer and songwriter.

Biography

Early career
Yates early music career was with Toronto-area bands such as Rang Tango, Senseless and The Last Resorts.

Yates was influenced by varied artists including Dolly Parton, Tanya Tucker, and Pink Floyd.

Nashville
Yates became a Nashville-based artist on the Columbia Records Nashville label. Her debut album Can't Stop the Girl was released worldwide in 1989. She was nominated for a Juno Award in 1990 as Best Female Country Vocalist, and was also nominated for a CCMA Award. She toured with such artists as
Big Sugar, Steve Earle, The Nitty Gritty Dirt Band and Dwight Yoakam. Co-writers during this time included Guy Clark, Don Schlitz and Matraca Berg.

Yates recorded the duet "Brother To Brother" with Gregg Allman for his album No Stranger to the Dark: The Best of Gregg Allman and on the soundtrack to the Patrick Swayze film Next of Kin.

She later signed with Virgin Music Canada and released her second album Breaking Point in 1994, a collection of roots, rock and soul. Rick Danko (The Band) and Jim Cuddy (Blue Rodeo) appeared as guest vocalists. She later toured with Blue Rodeo, Jann Arden, Colin James and Faith Hill. In 1996, Yates released her second Virgin Music Canada album Untogether, a complete musical departure into melodic trip-hop with Toronto's Opium Concepts. The album was recorded at Metalworks Studios in Mississauga, Ontario.

During this time period, she also contributed vocals to numerous songs for the gothic-oriented sci-fi television show Forever Knight, eight of which later appeared on the series' two soundtrack volumes.

Present
In 1998, Yates formed Hey Stella! with bassist Bazil Donovan of Blue Rodeo, David Baxter and Michelle Josef. The band remains active following the released of their 1999 self-titled CD. They won NOW Magazine's "Favourite Band" 2000.

She moved to Hamilton, Ontario with her family in 2002, where she produced the 2007 album The Book of Minerva with artists such as Bazil Donovan, Justin Rutledge and Tom Wilson.

She won "Songwriter of the Year" and Alternative Country Recording of the Year" at the 2007 Hamilton Music Awards on 18 November 2007.

She played with late Brian Griffith, (Daniel Lanois, Emmylou Harris, Willie Nelson), Mike Eastman (Ronnie Hawkins), Jack Pedler (Teenage Head) and many notable Hamilton musicians.  She is an original member of power pop/punk band The Eveyln Dicks with Chris Houston (The Forgotten Rebels) and Buckshot Bebee, Jimmy Vapid (The Vapids) and Cleave Anderson (Battered Wives, Blue Rodeo).
She is the creator/ producer of popular variety shows: Johnny Cash - The Original Punk, & Your Good Girl's Gonna Go Bad with The Nashville Rejects (Steve Miller, Ted Hawkins) as the back up band .
She is the creator/producer of popular on-going 6 week songwriting workshop which combines group work, studio recording and live performance - The Creative Genius Songwriting Workshop.
Yates has gained a solid reputation as a photographer with her i-phone6, .  As part of the i-phoneography movement, she shoots under the tag of #crazyates_xoxo. Has had 3 successful exhibitions:
Killer Tomatoes, Hamilton's Finest Female Vocalists, 2015
Framed, Hamilton Musicians & Creative Class, photo exhibit, 2014
Disappearing Hamilton, photo exhibit, 2013

"Sweetheart of the Valley" is Lori's 7th studio album. Released late Oct. 2015, it received critical acclaim as Yates' best work yet. Recorded at Knob & Tube Toronto, QED Media and This Ain't Hollywood, Hamilton, she enlisted Hey Stella! (David Baxter, Bazil Donovan, Michelle Josef) as the recording band. Additional musicians include; Steve Wood - pedal steel, Stephen Miller - guitar. Rita Chiarelli, Terra Lightfoot, and Ginger St. James are among a choir of background vocals.

Grants and Awards

City of Hamilton Arts Award - Established Artist 2014
Ontario Arts Council - Songwriting Grant, 2014
Hamilton Spectator People's Choice Awards 2012 - Favourite Female Vocalist, silver
Songwriter of the Year - Hamilton Music Awards 2007
Alternative Country Recording of the Year - Hamilton Music Awards 2007 for "The Book Of Minerva"
Ontario Arts Council - Recording Grant, 2007
SOCAN Award for No. 1 song "Usure De Jours"
NOW Magazine "Best Band" Readers Poll -2000
Kensington Market Community Awards - Best Female Artist - 1993
Juno Awards nomination 1990
Canadian Country Music Association nomination 1990

Discography

Albums

Singles

Rang Tango
 Rang Tango (1987)

Hey Stella!
 Hey Stella! (1999)

Guest appearances
 The Lucky Ones album from Willie P. Bennett (1989)
 South at Eight, North at Nine album from Colin Linden (1993)
 Hell's Kitchen album from Leslie Spit Treeo (1994)

Soundtracks
 Next of Kin (1989)
Contributed a duet with Gregg Allman titled "Brother To Brother"
 Forever Knight - Original Television Soundtrack (1996)
Contributed vocals to "The Hunger", "Black Rose", "Touch The Night", "Dark Side of the Glass" and the intro to the Queen of Harps suite
 The Hanging Garden (1997)
Contributed the recording "The Future Is Here"
 Forever Knight - More Music from the Original Television Soundtrack (1999)
Contributed vocals to "The Night Calls My Name", "Heart of Darkness" and "Destiny's Edge"

Compilations and tributes
 Borrowed Tunes: A Tribute to Neil Young (1994)
Contributed a cover of the Neil Young composition "Helpless"
 Classic Country, Vol. 5 (2000)
Contributed the recording "Scene of the Crime"
 No Stranger to the Dark: The Best Of Gregg Allman (2002)
Features Allman and Yates' duet "Brother To Brother" from the Next of Kin soundtrack

References

External links
Lori Yates Official Web Site
Forever Knight soundtrack information

Year of birth missing (living people)
Living people
Canadian women country singers
Canadian country songwriters
Canadian women guitarists
Musicians from Oshawa
Columbia Records artists